Norton Wood is a  biological Site of Special Scientific Interest south-east of Norton in Suffolk, England.

This ancient coppice with standards wood is on sand and loess over boulder clay. There are many pedunculate oak, hazel, ash and birch trees. The ground flora includes a number of uncommon plants such as oxlip.

There is access by a public footpath which goes through the wood.

References

Sites of Special Scientific Interest in Suffolk